The Resistance is a Chinese martial arts action film set during World War II, directed by Peng Zhang Li.

The Resistance is inspired by the beginning of the Japanese invasion of China where over 300,000 people in the capital of Nanjing were massacred. The movie mixes an epic tale of revenge with elements of martial art, ninja, adventure, and war movies.

Plot
In 1940 during the Second World War, a city named Shichen is controlled ruthlessly by general Takeshi and his imperial Japanese army. A masked murderer known as "The Black Dress Killer" is systematically killing Japanese soldiers, working his way to the top Japanese general, who is responsible for many deaths of men and women, including Xiaoyun's family. Xiaoyun is a peasant girl who joined the Chinese resistance to avenge her family. Meanwhile, an American reporter is sent to China to uncover the truth about the unrest between China and Japan. What he finds threatens his own life and later forces him to join the Chinese Resistance.

Cast
 Hu Sang as Xiaoyun
 Jeremy Marr Williams as Steven
 Peng Zhang Li as Takeshi
 Zhang Xiao Hua as Xiaolin
 Zhao Jiuyi as Chen Xi
 Johan Karlberg as Schultz
 Qiu Wu Tong as Ming Ming
 Li Yin as Feng Qing
 Zhang Ming Fang as Bangsu
 Li Zhong He as Laozhou
 Ma Hong Jing as Killer Geisha
 Yin Wang as Akita

Location
The Resistance was shot over seven months from October 2010 to April 2011 at Ningxia Film Studio, some scenes were shot at Zhejiang Province and Taohua Island, it was the first film shot there.

Released
The Resistance was released on November 10, 2011. It screened at the 2012 Cannes Film Festival on May 17, 2012. After a limited run in theaters in September, 2012, its DVD was released on February 12, 2013 in North America, 17 June 2013 in The UK & Ireland, 3 October 2013 in Netherlands & Belgium, and 3 April 2014 in Indonesia.

References
Andrew Skeates Movie Review Far East Films
Jonathan Regehr Movie Review The Resistance
City On Fire - The Resistance News article
1905 News article (Chinese)

External links 
 
 
 
  Official site created by Xenon Pictures

2011 films
2010s war films
Films set in China
Films shot in China
Films set in 1940
Films about World War II alternate histories
Japan in non-Japanese culture
Chinese war films